Eric Oduro Osae is a Ghanaian local governance expert, lawyer and chartered accountant who serves as the Director General of the internal audit agency of Ghana. He is the technical director to the Ministry of local Governance and Rural Development.  Osae is the Dean of Dean of graduate studies at the Institute of Local Governance. He is a local governance and policy commentator and analyst on radio and television stations in Ghana.

Early life and education 
Osae had his senior high school education at the Presbyterian Boys Secondary school, Accra. He continued at the University of Professional Studies to read accounting and became a chartered accountant. Osae continued his education at University of Cape Coast where he was awarded Bachelor of Commerce degree and in 2007 graduated as a Tax Lawyer at the Ghana School of law. He later went to University of London and was awarded Ph.D. in political economics.

Career 
Osae practiced previously from the Chamber of Koi Larbie and Co. and has served as the head of finance and accounts at the Institute of Local Government Studies between 2000 and 2010. He is the Technical Advisor for the Ministry of Local Government and Rural Development. Osae is currently the Director General of the Internal Audit agency. He is also an academic who is the Dean of graduate studies at the Institute of Local Governance.

References 

Living people
Year of birth missing (living people)
Presbyterian Boys' Senior High School alumni
University of Professional Studies alumni
Ghanaian accountants